Marala, also known as Murala, is a village in Gujrat District of Punjab province, Pakistan. It is located at 32°38'60N 74°30'0E and has an altitude of 234 metres.

Notable people
Fazal Ilahi Chaudhry 5th President of Pakistan from 1973 until 1978

See also
Marala Headworks

References

External links
Satellite Images of Marala

Populated places in Gujrat District